This is a list of Kenyan musicians and musical groups.

 Akothee
 Avril
 Ayub Ogada
 Cece Sagini
 Daddy Owen
 David Mathenge, a.k.a. Nameless
 Daudi Kabaka
 DJ Fita
 Eric Wainaina
 E-Sir
 Fadhili William
 Fundi Konde
 George Ramogi
 Gloria Muliro
 Harry Kimani
 Jabali Afrika
 Jason Dunford
 Jua Cali
 Kavirondo
 King Kaka
 Kleptomaniax
 Mejja
 Mercy Myra
 Mighty King Kong
 Monski
 Muroki
 Musa Juma
 Naiboi
 Necessary Noize
 Okatch Biggy
 Otile Brown
 Princess Jully
 Redsan
 Roger Whittaker
 Sanaipei Tande
 Sauti Sol
 Size 8
 Stella Mwangi
 Suzzana Owiyo
 Tony Nyadundo
 Wahu
 Wanyika bands, including Simba Wanyika and its offshoots
 Willy Paul
 Wyre

Kenya
musicians